The Battle of Pavlivka was a military engagement of the 2022 Russian invasion of Ukraine in the small village of Pavlivka, Volnovakha Raion. The village had been on the active frontline for months after the Russian offensive in Zaporizhzhia Oblast stalled, and it changed hands multiple times. On the morning of 29 October 2022, armed forces of the Russian Federation launched a major offensive against the village as part of an effort to capture Vuhledar. On 14 November, the Ministry of Defence of the Russian Federation reported the capture of the town.

Background 
Pavlivka lies just south of Vuhledar, a key high ground that enables Ukrainian forces to shell Volnovakha with conventional 152/155mm artillery, an important railway and supply hub of the RuAF in south-central Donetsk Oblast. In the early days of the 2022 Russian invasion of Ukraine, Russian forces captured Volnovakha, enabling them to storm the expanse between Volnovakha and Mariupol while also pushing north and reaching Pavlivka and the Kashlahach River. Ukrainian forces withdrew to Vuhledar, where the frontline has since stagnated.

On 21 June Ukrainian forces launched a localized counter-attack, recapturing Pavlivka and Mykilske with minimal casualties. Ukrainian forces also recaptured Shevcheko on the following day, and reaching Yehorivka on the 27th. Since then, Russian forces have encroached on the town's southern outskirts since, although intense fighting did not erupt until late October. Senior Lt. Andriy Mikheichenko, who led the counter-attack, claimed that Russian forces attempted to regain lost positions in the following days, but were ultimately repulsed.

Battle 
On the night of 28-29 October, Russian forces launched a large offensive on Pavlivka, a small town south of Vuhledar. During the attack, the southeastern part of the town was captured by Russian soldiers, and the entire town became contested between Ukrainian and Russian forces. Pro-Russian sources made varying claims ranging between half to full Russian control of the town, although none of these claims could be independently verified at the time. Fighting intensified on 1 November, with Ukrainian forces defending the northern part of Pavlivka near the Kashlahach river.

On 3 November the Russian Army's 155th Naval Infantry Brigade launched an offensive towards Pavlivka, suffering heavy casualties. The commander of the brigade posted a video pleading to the Primorye Oblast governor, where the NIB was originally located at, for help, as the brigade had suffered 300 casualties in the past four days, over a tenth of its manpower. By 14 November Russian forces claimed they secured Pavlivka. Some Russian opposition outlets claimed that 19 out of 120 Russian servicemen of the 155th Brigade survived the battle for Pavlivka.

Analysis 
On 27 November, the UK's Ministry of Defense claimed that both Russia and Ukraine had significant forces committed to this sector, with Russian Naval Infantry having suffered heavy casualties. It claimed that the area remained heavily contested, likely partially because Russia assessed the area had potential as a launch point for a future major advance north to capture the remainder of Ukrainian-held Donetsk Oblast. However, the MoD believed that Russia was unlikely to be able to concentrate sufficient quality forces to achieve an operational breakthrough.

Aftermath – Vuhledar Offensive

On 24 January 2023, Russian sources widely reported that Russian forces launched an offensive around Vuhledar, with elements of the 155th Naval Infantry Brigade of the Pacific Fleet breaking through Ukrainian defences in the Vuhledar area and advancing north of Pavlivka and west of Mykilske. The attempted advance was confirmed the following day by the Ukrainian military.

References 

Pavlivka
November 2022 events in Ukraine
December 2022 events in Ukraine
Eastern Ukraine offensive
Battles involving Russia
History of Donetsk Oblast